Imprecatory Psalms, contained within the Book of Psalms of the Hebrew Bible, are those that imprecate – invoke judgment, calamity or curses upon one's enemies or those perceived as the enemies of God. Major imprecatory Psalms include Psalm 69, while Psalms 5, 6, 11, 12, 35, 37, 40, 52, 54, 56, 57, 58, 59, 79, 83, 94, 137, 139 and 143 are also considered imprecatory. As an example, Psalm 69:24 states toward God, "Pour out Your indignation on them, and let Your burning anger overtake them."

The Psalms (or "praises"), considered part of both Hebrew and Christian Scripture, served as ancient Israel's "psalter" or "hymnbook", which was used during temple and private worship.

The New Testament contains passages that quote verses from these Psalms which are not imprecatory in nature. Jesus is shown quoting from them in John 2:17 and John 15:25, while Paul the Apostle quotes from Psalm 69 in the Epistle to the Romans 11:9-10 and 15:3.

Imprecations elsewhere in the Bible

Old Testament
Imprecations in the Hebrew Bible are not limited to the Imprecatory Psalms. The Nevi'im (prophetic literature) contains many, as well, in the books of Hosea, Micah, and Jeremiah, for example, leading to their categorization as "imprecatory topoi". Alongside this, in the Third Sermon of Moses in the book of Deuteronomy of the Torah, Moses is shown describing a litany of curses that would befall Israel for rebelliousness. Many of the same curses were later warned about by Joshua, some 100 years after Moses's death.

New Testament
The Old Testament is not alone in containing imprecations:
 Matthew 23:13: "But woe unto you, scribes and Pharisees, hypocrites! for ye shut up the kingdom of heaven against men: for ye neither go in yourselves, neither suffer ye them that are entering to go in."
 Matthew 26:23–24: "And he answered and said, He that dippeth his hand with me in the dish, the same shall betray me. The Son of man goeth as it is written of him: but woe unto that man by whom the Son of man is betrayed! it had been good for that man if he had not been born."
 1 Corinthians 16:22: "If any man love not the Lord Jesus Christ, let him be Anathema Maranatha."
 Galatians 1:8–9: "But though we, or an angel from heaven, preach any other gospel unto you than that which we have preached unto you, let him be accursed. As we said before, so say I now again, If any man preach any other gospel unto you than that ye have received, let him be accursed."
 Galatians 5:12: "I would they were even cut off which trouble you."
 2 Timothy 4:14: "Alexander the coppersmith did me much evil: the Lord reward him according to his works:"
 Revelation 6:10: "And they cried with a loud voice, saying, How long, O Lord, holy and true, dost thou not judge and avenge our blood on them that dwell on the earth?"

Context and meaning
Imprecatory Bible passages have presented a variety of interpretive and ethical issues for scholars throughout various times in various situations. Even so, some Biblical scholars agree that their intent is to purposefully alarm, and that invokers of imprecations in the Psalms did so for purposes of self catharsis, and to lead group catharsis during temple worship (see Solomon's Temple), noting that this probably helped provide ontological security to the Psalms' principal audience, the Israelites, who were a minority within their larger Mesopotamian world.

Scholars also widely agree that imprecatory passages are never imprecatory in total, but are contextualized within messages of hope or promised mercy and blessing. More so than anything, particularly for passages from the Nevi'im, the intent is to provoke group or national repentance from evil acts and turn the hearers toward God. Liturgical reforms by the Catholic Church after the Second Vatican Council led to the removal of some of the imprecatory psalms from the Divine Office, or the editing of more problematic passages for liturgical use.

Several theories have been put forth to interpret these psalms, justify their inclusion in the Bible, and apply them to life. These theories include the notion that the curses are allegorical, cathartic, belonging to a particular dispensation (time period), quotations of enemies, spells, prophecies, the words of the Messiah, or expressions of dependence.

See also

Jeremiad

Footnotes

References
J. W. Beardslee, "The Imprecatory Element in the Psalms," Presbyterian and Reformed Review, 8 (1987).
W. W. Davies, "The Imprecatory Psalms", The Old and New Testament Student, Vol. 14, No. 3 (Mar., 1892), pp. 154–159.
John N. Day, "The Imprecatory Psalms and Christian Ethics". Bibliotheca Sacra, 159 (April–June 2002): 166–86.  Available online.
J. Carl Laney. "A Fresh Look at the Imprecatory Psalms". Bibliotheca Sacra 138 (1981) 35–45.
Daniel M. Nehrbass. Praying Curses; The Therapeutic and Preaching Value of the Imprecatory Psalms. Wipf and Stock, 2013. 
John Piper, "Do I Not Hate Those Who Hate You, O Lord?"  Desiring God,  2000. Available online.
Samuel J. Schultz. The Old Testament Speaks: A Complete Survey of Old Testament History, 5th edition. HarperOne, 1999.
Erich Zenger. A God of Vengeance? Understanding the Psalms of Divine Wrath. Westminster John Knox, 1996.

Psalms
Christian terminology
Curses